Pärn is a common surname in Estonia (meaning linden), and may refer to:
Andre Pärn (born 1977), basketball player
Endel Pärn (1914–1990), actor
Harald Pärn (1912–1943), boxer (:et)
Illimar Pärn (born 1988), ski jumper
 (1843–1916), writer and pedagogue
Katrin Pärn (born 1977), actress
 (1903–1974), Soviet military commander
 (born 1945), actress
Olga Pärn (born 1976), animator, film director and illustrator
Priit Pärn (born 1946), cartoonist and animation director
Sander Pärn (born 1992), rally driver

See also
Lõhmus, another Estonian surname meaning Linden

Estonian-language surnames